The Roaring Road is a 1926 American silent action film directed by Paul Hurst and starring Kenneth MacDonald, Jane Thomas and William H. Strauss. Location shooting took place around Los Angeles including the Legion Ascot Speedway. A young racing driver pioneers a new car and enters it into a hundred mile race.

Cast
 Kenneth MacDonald as Jimmie Miller
 Jane Thomas as Minnie Rosenburg
 William H. Strauss as 	Sol Rosenburg
 George Bunny as James Miller
 Jeanne Wray as Betty - Rosenburg's Stenographer
Ben Corbett as Henchman 
 Paul Hurst as Checking Board Tabulator

References

Bibliography
 Connelly, Robert B. The Silents: Silent Feature Films, 1910-36, Volume 40, Issue 2. December Press, 1998.
 Munden, Kenneth White. The American Film Institute Catalog of Motion Pictures Produced in the United States, Part 1. University of California Press, 1997.

External links
 

1926 films
1920s action films
American silent feature films
American action films
American black-and-white films
Films directed by Paul Hurst
Films shot in Los Angeles
1920s English-language films
1920s American films
Silent action films